Rodolfo José da Silva Bardella (born 21 May 1992), simply known as Rodolfo is a Brazilian footballer who plays as a forward for Cruzeiro, on loan from América Mineiro.

Club career
Born in São Manuel, Rodolfo started his senior professional career with Jacutinga Atlético Clube before moving to Capivariano Futebol Clube in 2014. He was a part of the squad which won promotion to the Paulista A1 in 2014, scoring a goal in the final against Sociedade Esportiva Itapirense. On 30 April 2015, he joined Clube Atlético Bragantino on a loan deal.

After successive loan stints with Rio Branco and CRB, where he was rarely used, Rodolfo joined Série C (third tier) Boa Esporte Clube on 14 September 2016 again on loan. Four days later, he made his debut, scoring a goal in a 4–0 victory over Guaratinguetá. He ended the season winning the league.

On 3 January 2017, Rodolfo was loaned to São Bernardo Futebol Clube for the Paulista championship. He was later reloaned to Boa and scored a hat-trick on 11 November in a 4-3 victory over Santa Cruz Futebol Clube. In January 2018, he joined Emirati club Dibba Al-Fujairah on a loan deal. He made his debut against Al Wahda, scoring a goal in the 3–1 defeat.

References

External links

1992 births
Living people
Brazilian footballers
Association football forwards
Campeonato Brasileiro Série A players
Campeonato Brasileiro Série B players
Campeonato Brasileiro Série C players
UAE Pro League players
Elosport Capão Bonito players
Capivariano Futebol Clube players
Rio Branco Esporte Clube players
Clube Atlético Bragantino players
Clube de Regatas Brasil players
Boa Esporte Clube players
Dibba FC players
São Bernardo Futebol Clube players
Paraná Clube players
Fortaleza Esporte Clube players
Mirassol Futebol Clube players
Cuiabá Esporte Clube players
América Futebol Clube (MG) players
Cruzeiro Esporte Clube players
Brazilian expatriate footballers
Brazilian expatriate sportspeople in the United Arab Emirates
Expatriate footballers in the United Arab Emirates
People from São Manuel